The meridian 90° west of Greenwich is a line of longitude that extends from the North Pole across the Arctic Ocean, North America, the Gulf of Mexico, Central America, the Pacific Ocean, the Southern Ocean, and Antarctica to the South Pole.

In Antarctica, the meridian defines the western limit of Chile's territorial claim. The land further west is not claimed by any nation.

The 90th meridian west forms a great circle with the 90th meridian east, located midway between the Prime meridian and the 180th meridian; thus, the center of the Western Hemisphere is on this meridian.

In the United States, the Mississippi River runs close to the 90th meridian, crossing the meridian several times. The cities of St. Louis, Memphis and New Orleans are all close to the meridian.

One of the four 45 x 90 points is located in Rietbrock, Wisconsin, where the 45th parallel north intersects with the 90th meridian west, marking the halfway point between the 90° Latitude North, 180th Meridian East & West, 0° latitude, and 0° longitude.

From Pole to Pole
Starting at the North Pole and heading south to the South Pole, the 90th meridian west passes through:

{| class="wikitable plainrowheaders"
! scope="col" width="120" | Co-ordinates
! scope="col" | Country, territory or sea
! scope="col" | Notes
|-
| style="background:#b0e0e6;" | 
! scope="row" style="background:#b0e0e6;" | Arctic Ocean
| style="background:#b0e0e6;" |
|-
| 
! scope="row" | 
| Nunavut — Ellesmere Island
|-
| style="background:#b0e0e6;" | 
! scope="row" style="background:#b0e0e6;" | Nansen Sound
| style="background:#b0e0e6;" |
|-
| 
! scope="row" | 
| Nunavut — Axel Heiberg Island
|-
| style="background:#b0e0e6;" | 
! scope="row" style="background:#b0e0e6;" | Norwegian Bay
| style="background:#b0e0e6;" |
|-
| 
! scope="row" | 
| Nunavut — Graham Island
|-
| style="background:#b0e0e6;" | 
! scope="row" style="background:#b0e0e6;" | Norwegian Bay
| style="background:#b0e0e6;" |
|-
| 
! scope="row" | 
| Nunavut — North Kent Island and Devon Island
|-
| style="background:#b0e0e6;" | 
! scope="row" style="background:#b0e0e6;" | Barrow Strait
| style="background:#b0e0e6;" |
|-
| 
! scope="row" | 
| Nunavut — Prince Leopold Island
|-
| style="background:#b0e0e6;" | 
! scope="row" style="background:#b0e0e6;" | Prince Regent Inlet
| style="background:#b0e0e6;" |
|-
| 
! scope="row" | 
| Nunavut — Baffin Island
|-
| style="background:#b0e0e6;" | 
! scope="row" style="background:#b0e0e6;" | Gulf of Boothia
| style="background:#b0e0e6;" |
|-
| 
! scope="row" | 
| Nunavut — several islands including Helen Island, and the mainland
|-
| style="background:#b0e0e6;" | 
! scope="row" style="background:#b0e0e6;" | Hudson Bay
| style="background:#b0e0e6;" |
|-valign="top"
| 
! scope="row" | 
| Manitoba Ontario — from 
|-
| 
! scope="row" | 
| Minnesota
|-
| style="background:#b0e0e6;" | 
! scope="row" style="background:#b0e0e6;" | Lake Superior
| style="background:#b0e0e6;" |
|-valign="top"
| 
! scope="row" |  
|-
| style="background:#b0e0e6;" | 
! scope="row" style="background:#b0e0e6;" | Gulf of Mexico
| style="background:#b0e0e6;" |
|-valign="top"
| 
! scope="row" | 
| Yucatán Campeche — from 
|-
| 
! scope="row" | 
|Passing through Jalapa
|-
| 
! scope="row" | 
|
|-valign="top"
| style="background:#b0e0e6;" | 
! scope="row" style="background:#b0e0e6;" | Pacific Ocean
| style="background:#b0e0e6;" | Passing just west of Genovesa Island, Galápagos,  (at ) Passing just east of Santa Fe Island, Galápagos,  (at )
|-
| style="background:#b0e0e6;" | 
! scope="row" style="background:#b0e0e6;" | Southern Ocean
| style="background:#b0e0e6;" |
|-valign="top"
| 
! scope="row" | Antarctica
| Border between unclaimed territory (to the west) and Antártica Chilena Province (to the east), claimed by 
|-
|}

See also
89th meridian west
91st meridian west
45×90 points

w090 meridian west
Borders of Chile